Lankien is a boma in Thol Payam, Nyirol County, Eastern Bieh State, South Sudan.

Demographics 
According to the Fifth Population and Housing Census of Sudan, conducted in April 2008, Lankien boma had a population of 5,138 people, composed of 2,926 male and 2,212 female residents.

Notes

References 

Populated places in South Sudan